Hovis Ltd is a British company that produces flour and bread.

Hovis may also refer to:

Hovis biscuit, British manufactured digestive biscuit
Rank Hovis McDougall, now known as RHM plc, United Kingdom food business

People with the surname
Guy Hovis (born 1941), American singer
Hovis Presley (1960–2005), English poet and stand-up comedian
Larry Hovis (1936–2003), American singer and actor
Raymond Hovis (born  1934), American politician, former member of the Pennsylvania House of Representatives

See also
Hovi